4-Ethylphenyl sulfate (4EPS) is a metabolite produced by gut bacteria, which can be toxic when present in large amounts. Elevated levels of this metabolite have been associated with some medical conditions including chronic kidney disease and autism.

See also 
 Indoxyl sulfate

References 

Sulfate esters
Toxins